Rafael Hoyos Rubio (1924–1981) was a Peruvian general who held the rank of General of the Army and occupied the post of Commander in Chief of the Peruvian Army from December 5, 1980 to June 1981. He was born in Cajamarca on January 8, 1924 and died at the Peru-Ecuador border in 1981. 

Orestes was the son of Hoyos Rocha and Victoria Rubio Villacorta. He was married to Nelly De Vinatea, who bore him six children including Rafael (who also became General of the Army), Maria Victoria, Raúl, Luis, Nelly and Carmen.

Education 
Rubio completed his primary and secondary education in the city of Cajamarca. In 1942 he joined the Army as a volunteer soldier and went on to study at the Escuela de . In March 1944 he entered the Military School in Chorrillos, graduating as Sub Lieutenant of the Infantry with the 50th Promotion "Junín".

In 1955 he entered the War College. Afterwards he did Tactical advanced training courses at Fort Gulick Panama, and Advanced Infantry at Fort Benning, USA.

Career 
Throughout his career Rubio served in various garrisons of the Republic, in addition he was an instructor at the Military School of Chorrillos and the School Infantry. Between 1966 and 1968 he served as military attache in Chile. As Brigadier General he was Head of the Special Forces Detachment and Commander of the Ninth Armored Division. During the government of General Juan Velasco Alvarado he served as Minister of Food. In 1978 already boasted the rank of General of Division, he served as Commanding General of the Academic Centres and State Major General of the Army in 1979. He was chairman of the Joint Command of the Armed Forces (1979–1980).

In 1981 he was Commander General of the Army and as such was responsible for the operations of the Cordillera del Condor, acting at the Paquisha point in the confrontation with Ecuador.

Recognition 
In June 1981, while undertaking a Command visit, General Hoyos Rubio was killed in an air accident. Today, in the city of Cajamarca, an avenue is named after him. Rubio, who had been one of the conspirators in the de Velasco coup, implored officials to never again stop aspiring towards saving the country. Of these pronouncements, Hoyos said the country itself is not saved and is violated by the military unit.

In 2007 the "Major General Rafael Hoyos Rubio" Military College was founded in the city of Cajamarca.

Awards 
 Military Order of Ayacucho in the degree of "Knight".
 Peruvian Military Merit Cross in the rank of officer.
 Order of May at the rank of Commander granted by the Argentine government.
 Grand Cross of the Order of Military Merit from the Spanish

References

External links 
 Sitio oficial del Ejército del Perú
 Hoja de Vida del General Rafael Hoyos Rubio

Peruvian soldiers
1924 births
1981 deaths
People from Cajamarca
Victims of helicopter accidents or incidents
Peruvian expatriates in Panama
Peruvian expatriates in the United States